Samia Najimy Finnerty (born December 12, 1996) is an American singer-songwriter from New York City.

Early life
Finnerty was born to Lebanese-American actress Kathy Najimy and American actor Dan Finnerty. She was named after her maternal grandmother, Samia Najimy (née Massery; 1928–2015), who is of Lebanese origin. She attended York Preparatory School, and studied at The New School.

Career
Finnerty is a co-recipient of the 2017 Obie Award for Best Ensemble for her performance in Sarah DeLappe's The Wolves.

Finnerty released a new song in April 2020 titled "Is There Something in the Movies?" In June 2020, Finnerty announced her debut studio album alongside a new song titled "Fit n Full". Two more songs from the album, "Big Wheel" and "Stellate," were released together in July 2020, preceding the release of "Triptych" in August 2020. Finnerty released her debut studio album The Baby to positive reviews in September 2020.

Finnerty appeared briefly in the comedy drama film Let Them All Talk (2020).

In 2021, Finnerty released the extended play Scout, containing three original songs: "As You Are", "Show Up" and "Elephant" as well as a cover of When In Rome's' "The Promise", which featured Jelani Aryeh. The EP released to generally positive reviews.

Finnerty attended the European leg of Maggie Rogers' Feral Joy Tour as a "special guest" in 2022.

In September 2022, Finnerty released the single "Kill Her Freak Out" and announced her upcoming second album, Honey. Subsequent singles from the album include "Mad At Me" with Papa Mbye in November and a double release in December, "Pink Balloon/Sea Lions." Honey released on January 27, 2023 to positive reviews.

Discography

Studio albums

Remix albums

Extended plays

Singles

Acting career

References

External links
 
 Samia at Bandcamp
 
 

1996 births
Living people
21st-century American women singers
21st-century American singers
American indie rock musicians
American women rock singers
American women singer-songwriters
Singers from Los Angeles
Singers from New York City
Singer-songwriters from California
Singer-songwriters from New York (state)
American people of Lebanese descent
The New School alumni